The Face at Your Window is a 1920 American drama film directed by Richard Stanton and written by Edward Sedgwick. The film stars Gina Relly, Earl Metcalfe, Edward Roseman, Boris Rosenthal, Walter McEwen and Diana Allen. The film was released on October 31, 1920, by Fox Film Corporation.

Cast            
Gina Relly as Ruth Kravo
Earl Metcalfe as Frank Maxwell
Edward Roseman as Comrade Kelvin
Boris Rosenthal as Ivan Koyloff
Walter McEwen as Hiram Maxwell
Diana Allen as 'Dot' Maxwell
Alice Reeves as Ethel Harding
Frazer Coulter as Nicholas Harding 
William Corbett as Steve Drake
Robert Cummings as Kravo
Henry Armetta as Danglo
Frank Farrington as District Attorney

References

External links
 

1920 films
1920s English-language films
Silent American drama films
1920 drama films
Fox Film films
Films directed by Richard Stanton
American silent feature films
American black-and-white films
1920s American films